is a spin-off installment of the Ace Combat flight simulation video game series. It was developed by Project Aces and published by Bandai Namco Games for the PlayStation 3 and Xbox 360 platforms in October 2011. The game was later released on Microsoft Windows in January 2013 through Steam and Games for Windows – Live, with the latter notably being the final retail release for the platform shortly before its discontinuation.

The major new gameplay feature is a system called "Dogfighting mode" (DFM), which aims to increase the intensity and bring the action closer to the player. The game features two modes of control, named "Optimum", which prevents the player from doing full rolls, and  "Original", which gives the players full control of the aircraft. Co-operative missions and free-for-all Deathmatch have returned, but two new modes named "Capital Conquest" and "Domination" were added to the game. This is also the first Ace Combat title with a plot mostly written by non-Japanese writers, with noted author Jim DeFelice at the helm. Set in 2015–2016, the game's story mainly focuses on members of the United Nations' 108th Task Force, a joint NATO-Russia military organization primarily assigned to quell a rebellion spreading over East Africa.

Assault Horizon continued the trend of Ace Combat games set in the real Earth rather than on "Strangereal", the setting for most Ace Combat games. As a result, the game takes place in various regions, including Miami, East Africa, Moscow, and Dubai. The game received a generally positive reception upon release, with critics praising the game's settings, graphics, and the soundtrack. However, some critics criticized the game for having repetitive gameplay and being overly-scripted. More than 1.07 million copies were sold worldwide upon release.

Gameplay

The major new gameplay feature is a system called "Close-Range Assault" (CRA), which aims to increase the intensity and bring the action closer to the player, without the feeling of "shooting at faraway dots" commonly seen in flight games. In the game, it is named "Dogfight Mode" (DFM) for air-to-air battles and "Air Strike Mode" (ASM) for air-to-ground targets. They are not optional, as certain planes and ground targets cannot be destroyed without CRA. To initiate DFM, the player taps LB+RB on the Xbox 360 or L2+R2 on the PS3 when they have gotten close enough to the plane they are targeting. ASM is initiated by pressing the same buttons at specific points around the map. Players will also pilot other aircraft types and assume other combat aviation functions; the game introduces the B-1 and B-2 strategic bombers and the AH-64 Apache and UH-60 Black Hawk helicopters as player-flyable vehicles. Certain missions may call for players to act as Black Hawk door gunners or weapons officers aboard the AC-130 Spectre gunship.

Multiplayer
Assault Horizon's multiplayer has been improved since Ace Combat 6: Fires of Liberation. Co-operative missions and free-for-all Deathmatch have returned, but two new modes have been added as well: "Capital Conquest" and "Domination". In Capital Conquest, two teams of 4v4 or 8v8 each take control of their own headquarters, and must destroy the other team's headquarters. First, the transmission base in the center of the map must come under one team's control; once that's accomplished, the team's multi-roles and attackers (and bombers, given the right conditions) can initiate Air Strike Mode to damage the other team's HQ. The first team to destroy the other's HQ wins; if the time limit is reached before an HQ could be destroyed, then the team with the most HQ health remaining wins. On the Ace Combat website, players can join an online faction (one for each capital city featured in Capital Conquest), and any points they receive individually while playing in a certain city will go towards that player's faction's control of that city. Every six weeks, the faction with the most global control wins.

In Domination, two teams of 4v4 or 8v8 battle it out to take control of three different bases in one single city. Taking control of a base is similar to the "King of the Hill" mode in other games; when a base is neutral, one team must stay inside it for a certain amount of time to take it over. The opposing team must destroy the ground targets that now pop up around that base, and then they must stay inside for a certain amount of time to take it over. Every 60 seconds, points are awarded to each team, 1 for each base they control at the time. The team with the most points wins.

Controls
There are two control schemes in the game: "Optimum" and "Original":
 The new "Optimum" control scheme prevents the player from doing full rolls, to gain the stability needed to get the best of the new Close Range Assault system. This is the default mode that has been used in most of the game's media and hasn't been seen in the series.
 The "Original" control scheme is similar to the controls in the previous titles under "Expert". It gives the players full control of the aircraft, with the left stick making it roll instead of turn.

In addition to these settings, there are many options to tweak the controls and adapt to the player's style. It includes the choice of normal or reverse settings for the Pitch Control, Camera Control, Throttle, and Yaw. High-G turns return from Ace Combat 6: Fires of Liberation, as well as Auto Pilot if both shoulder buttons are held down. Lastly, the Flight Assistance provides opportunities to players such as Auto-leveling, Automatic Collision Prevention, Automatic Stall Prevention, Sight Assist, and Automatic Forward Target Selection. Flight Assistance can be turned on or off. On the Xbox 360, the game supports the Ace Edge Joysticks released with Ace Combat 6: Fires of Liberation.

Plot

Setting
Unlike other games in the Ace Combat series (but in the same vein as Ace Combat: Joint Assault), Assault Horizon takes place in real-world locations. The story itself takes place between 2015 and 2016, in locations within East Africa, the Middle East, Russia, and the United States.

Characters
The game's protagonists are mostly members of the United Nations' 108th Task Force, a joint NATO-Russian military organization primarily assigned to quell a rebellion spreading over East Africa. Players primarily assume the role of Lieutenant Colonel William Bishop, head of the United States Air Force's Warwolf Squadron. He is assisted by wingman José "Guts" Gutierrez, French NATO General Pierre La Pointe and pilots of the 108th's Nomad, Shooter, and Spooky squadrons. The antagonists are Russian General Ivan Stagleishov, and Russian Air Force pilots Andrei Markov and Maj. Sergei Illich, who are members of a Russian criminal syndicate called the Blatnoi.

Story
In the prologue, USAF Lieutenant Colonel William Bishop leads an American defense of Miami against Russian forces, but is shot down by a mysterious plane with a "shark mouth" motif; the entire sequence is revealed to be a nightmare. He later awakes and sees the survivors of a helicopter raid on an insurgent stronghold in East Africa being rushed in for treatment. Their force is wiped out after a large explosive device is set off on the stronghold by the SRN rebel group. The 108th regroups to rescue Maj. Sergei Illich, a Russian officer, serving with the task force who was shot down in an earlier operation. The SRN's use of the powerful explosive leads the 108th to an SRN cave hideout near the archaeological ruins of Mogadiyu, but the 108th's Russian co-commander, General Stagleishov, holds back his forces from joining the attack and even launch their fighters. On the way back, Warwolf receives a distress call from a city under rebel attack, but they are intercepted by the Russians. In the course of the battle, Bishop is shot down by Andrei Markov, a highly skilled Russian pilot who flies the same plane from Bishop's nightmare. The Russians withdraw, and the rebels detonate a more powerful version of the mysterious explosive on the 108th's base just as Warwolf lands.

The 108th identifies the new weapon as "Trinity", a conventional explosive with the power of a tactical nuclear weapon and designed for various weapon platforms such as cruise missiles. The 108th's survivors head to Dubai to defend the city from elements of the Russian criminal organization Blatnoi aiming to use the weapon on the city and intercept rebel cargo ships in hopes of finding Trinity weapons. However, this buys the Blatnoi time to launch a coup d'état in Russia with massive support from the Russian military. Under Stagleishov's command, the so-called New Russian Federation quickly takes control of Moscow and its surrounding areas, while the 108th joins other loyalist Russian units to take on the coup forces. Illich, who was one of the Russian pilots to leave East Africa, assists in the counteroffensive but disappears as the 108th successfully shoots down a Trinity cruise missile and an ICBM targeted for the United States. A Trinity missile destroys much of the 108th's strike force heading to Moscow, and Bishop leads Warwolf in shooting down a Russian bomber squadron bearing down on the capital; he also takes out Markov's personal plane, and the pilot ejects. Seeing the futility of resistance, Stagleishov negotiates the NRF's surrender by exchanging the final Trinity missile for political immunity, but Markov kills him and steals the weapon. It is revealed that Markov planned everything as revenge against the U.S. for an airstrike during the Bosnian War that killed his wife, with the coup as a decoy to lure many American forces out of the homeland and weaken its defenses.

Illich is revealed as Markov's sleeper agent and betrays the 108th by joining his forces bound for the U.S. from bases in South America. The 108th and several American combat units reinforce and defend Miami against an onslaught by Markov's forces. Bishop's earlier nightmare comes to life, but Guts is able to protect him, and the Trinity missile on Markov's plane is damaged in the process. Bishop then chases after an escaping Markov and Illich and encounters them in the midst of a Category 5 hurricane, Markov escapes while Illich covers his retreat after a long and challenging battle Bishop finally overcomes Illich. The 108th recovers and assists in defense of Washington DC against a larger Russian attack. In a final showdown, Bishop finally eliminates Markov and shoots down his Trinity missile aimed at the White House. Upon landing his plane at Reagan National Airport, Bishop is given a hero's welcome while Guts is safely rescued.

Development
The game was first hinted at by a trademark filing by Bandai Namco in April 2010, then officially announced along with a gameplay trailer on August 9. Gameplay has been expanded to include the use of helicopters and gunships as well. The trailer showed the player using an AH-64D Apache Longbow gunship and occupying the gunner's position on the UH-60 Black Hawk while attacking a desert village. In the trailer, the US Air Force is engaged in dogfighting with Russian fighters over Miami. The player is in an F-22 engaging and destroying several enemies before being shot down himself. Pierre La Pointe, the French commander of the 108th Task Force, briefs the Task Force on an Ace leading the attack on Miami named Col. Markov who has been nicknamed Akula (Russian for shark) because of the design on the nose of his plane. Russian involvement in the conflict has been described as "advisers and mercenaries" in the E3 Trailer. Another scene showed a US A-10 attacking a fleet of naval ships. The extended trailer had additional scenes of air battles with the player flying an F-35 and an F-16 over Dubai and an attack on a desert oil facility. The time is set sometime in 2015 and takes place in East Africa.

Ace Combat: Assault Horizon continues the trend of Ace Combat games set in the real Earth rather than on "Strangereal", the setting for most Ace Combat games. The game takes place over a number of locations, including: Miami, East Africa, Dubai and the Middle East, Russia (Derbent, the Black Sea, Caucasus, and Moscow specifically), and Washington, D.C. Fictional towns and cities were also used, including Mogadiyu, Carruth, and Belyi Base (believed to be based on Belaya). The developers used satellite imagery to accurately render real-life locations, making it possible for players to pick out actual buildings and locations while playing the game. Miami, East Africa, Dubai, Moscow, and Washington, D.C. are available in multiple multiplayer modes alongside Paris. Honolulu and Tokyo were added as downloadable maps.

A demo was released on September 13, 2011. All PlayStation 3 players could download it for free, but Xbox 360 players needed to have Xbox LIVE Gold for the first week in order to download it; it then migrated to Xbox LIVE Silver as well. The demo included Mission 1 and Mission 3, with the iconic nightmare air battle over Miami from the trailers and the attack helicopter rescue operation in Africa, respectively. It has since been removed and is no longer able for other players to download.

Macross creator Shouji Kawamori designed a fictional plane for the game, the "ASF-X Shinden II", which was released on October 25 the same year and was offered as downloadable content. It could be purchased in the PlayStation Store for US$7.99 or in the Xbox Marketplace for 640 MS Points.

Release
For European regions, Bandai Namco released a "Limited Edition" that also included the game's soundtrack, a redeemable code to download the F-4E Phantom II aircraft, and a notebook signed by the development team, all in a folded box. Gamers who pre-ordered this Limited Edition of the game received it for the same price as the standard edition. A separate "Helicopter Edition" was also released, containing a 25 cm remote-controlled Black Hawk helicopter (with the livery seen in the game), a remote control, a rechargeable battery for the helicopter, and a branded pen and keychain, along with all of the contents of the Limited Edition. A special edition released in Japan included Aces at War: A History, a special artbook detailing the content from Ace Combat Zero, 4, and 5 from an in-universe perspective, as well as production notes from the Project Aces team.

In Japan, gamers who pre-ordered the game received a code to download the F-4E Phantom II. In the United States, GameStop also offered the plane as an exclusive pre-order bonus. The Japanese edition of the game also has options to download special skins for the F-14D representing Roy Fokker and Hikaru Ichijo's VF-1 Valkyrie transformable fighters from Macross.

A patch was released on 26 November 2012, that fixed some of the jarring issues players had complained about with the multiplayer, specifically about players cheating with certain weapons or maneuvers. A day later, the PC version of the game was officially announced, as well as the availability of the game on the PlayStation Store and Xbox 360 Games on Demand. The PC version was available through retailers as well as Steam and Games for Windows Marketplace.

The "Enhanced Edition" is exclusive to PCs; it comes with optimized controls and graphics as well as several additional aircraft, aircraft skins, multiplayer maps, and multiplayer skills. It was released in the winter of 2012.

The "Advanced Edition" was exclusive to the PlayStation Store. It came with the Tokyo and Honolulu maps, as well as the ASF-X Shinden II, F-15S/MTD, Su-37 Terminator, AV-8B Harrier II, CFA-44 Nosferatu, and Ka-50 Hokum.

Tie-in novel
In March 2012, ASCII Media Works released Ace Combat: Ikaros in the Sky. A tie-in novel for Assault Horizon, Ikaros in the Sky is the story of series character Kei Nagase as she participates in the JASDF's ASF-X Shinden II fighter program.

Reception

The game has garnered generally positive reviews. Metacritic gives the game a 78 out of 100 (based on 71 reviews) for the Xbox 360 release, a 77 out of 100 (based on 28 reviews) for the PlayStation 3 release, and a 77/100 for the Enhanced Edition on PC.

Critics praised the real-world settings, graphics, and the soundtrack, but criticized the game for being repetitive and overly scripted. Critics also praised the voice-acting of the characters. Reception from the audience has also been positive; users on Metacritic give a 6.8/10 for the Xbox 360 and a 7.2/10 for the PS3, with some gamers feeling that the new gameplay elements kept the series "fresh and exciting". IGN gave Assault Horizon a 7.5/10, praising the game for keeping the arcade-like controls to make it easy to jump into. The editor noted that this was more like a spin-off than an actual part of the series, especially since it didn't have a number; however, it was again criticized for its repetition in the new Close Range Assault systems. GameSpot gave the game a 5.5/10 and 1UP gave it a D+, finding some of these criticized features to be what ruined the game's potential, and comparing the game to the Call of Duty series.

In response to the initial mostly positive response, Bandai Namco Games created a special "Accolades Trailer" one month after the game's release, in which many of the positive comments from well-known reviewers are featured alongside gameplay. As of 8 May 2012, the game has sold 1.07 million copies worldwide.

Notes

References

External links

Official US website
Official EU website
Official JP website

2011 video games
Combat flight simulators
Games for Windows certified games
PlayStation 3 games
Video game sequels
Video games developed in Japan
Video games scored by Takahiro Izutani
Video games set in 2015
Video games set in 2016
Video games set in the 2010s
Video games set in Africa
Video games set in Dubai
Video games set in Egypt
Video games set in Miami
Video games set in Russia
Video games set in Washington, D.C.
Video games set in Moscow
Windows games
Xbox 360 games
Multiplayer and single-player video games
Video games about dreams
Video games set in Virginia
Ace Combat spin-off games